The 2009–10 United States Open Cup for Arena Soccer is the second edition of an open knockout style tournament for Arena/Indoor Soccer. Teams from the Professional Arena Soccer League and Premier Arena Soccer League participated in the Tournament.

US Arena Open Cup bracket

Qualifying
Green indicates qualification for Qualifying Tournament Knockout Round(s)
Bold Indicates Qualifying Tournament Winner and qualification to US Arena Open Cup

Group Matches November 22, 2009
Colorado Springs Cavaliers 4, Highlands Ranch Heat 2
Fort Collins Fury 5, Highlands Ranch Heat 3
Colorado Springs Cavaliers 7, Fort Collins Fury 5

Final November 22, 2009
Colorado Springs Cavaliers 10, Fort Collins Fury 7
Colorado Springs Cavaliers qualify for US Arena Open Cup Round of 16

Group Matches: November 29, 2009
Vitesse Dallas 8, Outlaws Reserves 3
Niño Soccer Club 5, Outlaws Reserves 0
Vitesse Dallas 10, Niño Soccer Club 3
Vitesse Dallas qualify for US Arena Open Cup Round of 16

Group Matches December 5, 2009
7:00am: Pumitas 3, Liga Bolts 0
7:30am: San Diego Fusion 8, Los Angeles Bolts 2
8:00am: ASC Hammers 3, San Diego Surf 1
8:30am: San Diego Select 3, Revolucion Tijuana 2
9:00am: Pumitas 4, San Diego Select 2
9:30am: Revolucion Tijuana 6, Liga Bolts 2
10:00am: San Diego Fusion 4, ASC Hammers 3
10:30am: Los Angeles Bolts 4, San Diego Surf 3

Quarterfinals December 5, 2009
11:00am: San Diego Fusion 8, Liga Bolts 0
11:45am: Pumitas 4, San Diego Surf 0
12:30pm: Los Angeles Bolts 5, Revolucion Tijuana 2
1:15pm: ASC Hammers 5, San Diego Select 1

Semifinals December 5, 2009
2:30pm: San Diego Fusion 5, Los Angeles Bolts 3
3:30pm: ASC Hammers 4, Pumitas 2

Final December 5, 2009
4:30pm: San Diego Fusion 5, ASC Hammers 1
San Diego Fusion qualify for US Arena Open Cup Round of 16

Group Matches December 12, 2009
2:15pm: Turlock Express 3, Sacramento Scorpions 1
3:00pm: Estadio Azteca All Stars 3, Chico Bigfoot 0
4:00pm: Chico Bigfoot 3, Sacramento Scorpions 2
4:45pm: Estadio Azteca All Stars 10, Turlock Express 4

Final December 12, 2009
5:45pm: Estadio Azteca All Stars 8, Chico Bigfoot 3
Estadio Azteca All Stars qualify for US Arena Open Cup Wild Card Round

References

United States Open Cup for Arena Soccer
United States Open Cup for Arena Soccer
Open Cup for Arena Soccer
Open Cup for Arena Soccer
United States